Rotary Youth Leadership Awards (RYLA) is a leadership program coordinated by Rotary Clubs around the globe.  Individuals aged 14–30 are sponsored by Rotary Clubs to attend event(s) run by the club's district committee.  The format of the event vary from district to district, but commonly take the form of a seminar, camp, or workshop to discuss leadership skills and to learn those skills through practice. Rotary clubs and districts select participants and facilitate the event's curriculum.

History 

In 1959, the State Government of Queensland, Australia, invited local Rotary Clubs to help plan an event to help celebrate the upcoming centennial of the state. Princess Alexandra, who was in her early 20's was due to attend the celebrations, so activities were planned specifically for the princess's age group.

The gundoo, an aboriginal word meaning "festival" or "fun together," was deemed successful with more than 300 men and women between the ages of 17 and 23 attending. Rotary sought to create an annual youth program based on Gundoo. The governor of the then District 260, Art Brand, approved the project and on 2 May 1960, RYLA was an official Rotary project.

Australian districts 258 and 260 established a committee together that developed the official framework of RYLA: to train youth ages 14-30 in character, leadership, personal development, and good citizenship. These guidelines helped RYLA expand to all Rotary districts in Australia and led to its approval as a Rotary International program by the Rotary International Board at the 1971 Convention in Sydney, Australia.

See also 

 Rotary International

Related Sites 
 RYLA District 1180
 RYLA District 2031
 RYLA District 2032
 RYLA JUNIOR Mantova Italy 2050
 RYLA District 5100 (Oregon & SW Washington. Week long program for young adults ages 19-28)
 RYLA District 5340 (San Diego & Imperial Counties)
 Rocky Mountain RYLA Hosted by District 5440 and District 5450 (Northern Colorado, Wyoming, Eastern Idaho & Western Nebraska)
 Great Plains RYLA Hosted by District 5630 (Nebraska)
 RYLA District 5810 (North Texas)
 RYLA District 5870 (Central Texas)
 Iowa RYLA Hosted by District 5970 and District 6000 (Iowa)
 RYLA District 6510 (Illinois)
 RYLA District 6760 (Tennessee)
 RYLA District 7255 (New York)
 RYLA District 7390 (Pennsylvania)
 RYLA District 7410 (NE Pennsylvania)
 RYLA District 7490
 RYLA District 9640 (NSW, Australia)
 RYLA District 9710 (Australia)
 RYLA District 9780 (Victoria, Australia)
 RYLA District 9790 (Victoria, Australia)
 RYLA District 9800 (Victoria, Australia)
 RYLA District 9810
 RYPEN District 9810 (Victoria, Australia) Leadership program for under 18 in District 9810
 RYLA District 9810 (Victoria, Australia) Leadership program for 18 and over in District 9810
 RYLA District 9920 (Central, Eastern & South Auckland as far as Tuakau (including the Pacific Islands of Samoa, Fiji, Rarotonga, Vanuatu & French Polynesia, New Zealand)
RYLA District 9650 (Central, Western and Northern regional NSW, Australia. Leadership and personal development program for 19 to 26 year olds)

References 

Rotary International